Juan Carlos Spir (born 1 May 1990) is a Colombian tennis player playing on the ATP Challenger Tour. He played college tennis for the Georgia Tech Yellow Jackets and was a three-time ITA All-American (2011, 2012, 2013) and a three-time All-ACC performer.

On September 8, 2014, he reached his highest ATP singles ranking of 410 and his highest doubles ranking of 122, on August 4, 2014.

Central American and Caribbean Games

Doubles: 1

Tour titles

Singles: 3 (1–2)

Doubles: 12 (7–5)

Notes

See also

 List of Georgia Institute of Technology athletes

References

External links
 
 

1990 births
Living people
Colombian male tennis players
Sportspeople from Medellín
Georgia Tech Yellow Jackets men's tennis players
Central American and Caribbean Games gold medalists for Colombia
Competitors at the 2014 Central American and Caribbean Games
Central American and Caribbean Games medalists in tennis
20th-century Colombian people
21st-century Colombian people